Thomas J A Bishop (born 8 April 1947) is a British rower who competed at the 1976 Summer Olympics.

Rowing career
Bishop won a silver medal rowing for the Durham Amateur Rowing Club in the men's double sculls with Geoff Potts at the 1972 British Rowing Championships. He also competed for Durham University Boat Club at one time and was the second former member of the club to be selected to represent Great Britain. 

He was selected by Great Britain as part of the quad sculls at the 1975 World Rowing Championships, the quad finished in sixth place in the A final. At the 1976 Olympic Games he rowed as part of the men's quadruple sculls with Andrew Justice, Mark Hayter and Allan Whitwell, the crew finished in ninth place.

Personal life
He married fellow international rower Diana Bishop.

References

1947 births
Living people
British male rowers
Olympic rowers of Great Britain
Rowers at the 1976 Summer Olympics
Place of birth missing (living people)
Durham University Boat Club rowers